Unary system may refer to:
 Unary numeral system
 Unary operation